A luminous red nova (abbr. LRN, pl. luminous red novae, pl.abbr. LRNe) is a stellar explosion thought to be caused by the merging of two stars. They are characterised by a distinct red colour, and a light curve that fades slowly with resurgent brightness in the infrared. Luminous red novae are not related to standard novae, which are explosions that occur on the surface of white dwarf stars.

Discovery

A small number of objects exhibiting the characteristics of luminous red novae have been observed over the last 30 years or so. The red star M31 RV in the Andromeda Galaxy flared brightly during 1988 and may have been a luminous red nova. In 1994, V4332 Sagittarii, a star in the Milky Way galaxy, flared similarly, and in 2002, V838 Monocerotis followed suit and was studied quite closely.

The first confirmed luminous red nova was the object M85 OT2006-1, in the galaxy Messier 85. It was first observed during the Lick Observatory Supernova Search, and subsequently investigated by a team of astronomers from both U.C. Berkeley and Caltech. They confirmed its difference from known explosions such as novae and thermal pulses, and announced luminous red novae as a new class of stellar explosion.

V1309 Scorpii is a luminous red nova that followed the merger of a contact binary in 2008. In January 2015, a luminous red nova was observed in the Andromeda Galaxy. On February 10, 2015, a luminous red nova, known as M101 OT2015-1 was discovered in the Pinwheel Galaxy.

Characteristics

The luminosity of the explosion occurring in luminous red novae is between that of a supernova (which is brighter) and a nova (dimmer). The visible light lasts for weeks or months, and is distinctively red in colour, becoming dimmer and redder over time. As the visible light dims, the infrared light grows and also lasts for an extended period of time, usually dimming and brightening a number of times.

Infrared observations of M85 OT2006-1 have shown that temperature of this star  is slightly less than 1000 K, a rather low temperature. It is not clear if this characteristic is shared by other luminous red novae.

Evolution

The team investigating M85 OT2006-1 believe it to have formed when two main sequence stars merged. (See the article on V838 Mon for further information on mergebursts and alternative possibilities.)

At the time the mergeburst occurs, the LRN appears to expand extremely rapidly, reaching thousands to tens of thousands of solar radii in only a few months. This would cause the object to cool, explaining the intriguing co-existence of a bright flash with a cool post-flash object.

Other viewpoints

Some astronomers believe it to be premature to declare a new class of stellar explosions based on such a limited number of observations.
For instance, they may be due to a type II-p supernova; alternatively, supernovae undergoing a high level of extinction will naturally be both red and of low luminosity.

Prediction
In 2017 KIC 9832227, a binary star system, was predicted to merge and produce a red nova by early 2022. In September 2018, a typo was discovered in data used for the initial prediction, and it was determined that the merger would likely not take place at the predicted time.

See also 
 Binary star
 Cataclysmic variable star
 Dwarf nova
 Hypernova
 Nova
 Supernova

References

External links 
 Caltech Press Release "Caltech and Berkeley Astronomers Identify a New Class of Cosmic Explosions"
Smithsonian/NASA ADS Astronomy Abstract Service "Spitzer Observations of the New Luminous Red Nova M85 OT2006-1"
 Cosmos Online "Stars merge in new cosmic explosion"

 
Stellar phenomena